Amblytelus curtus is a species of ground beetle in the subfamily Psydrinae. It was described by Johan Christian Fabricius in 1801.

References

Amblytelus
Beetles described in 1801